The Armed Revolutionary Action (ARA) was the armed arm of the Portuguese Communist Party (PCP), as a semi-autonomous organization that was active from 1970 to 1973, under the Estado Novo dictatorship then led by Marcelo Caetano. The first meeting of the Central Committee of the PCP on the use of violence as an action of self-defense took place in December 1962, and marked the Party's position on this issue, seeking to relate it to mass actions. Violence was not excluded, and could be used in the paradigm of the "national uprising", as long as it was directed by the Party, and in a context of radicalization and intensification of the mass struggle, which could lead to a revolutionary environment.

In 1964, the PCP decided to create the "special actions," and in 1965, the nucleus, composed of Raimundo Narciso and Rogério de Carvalho, goes to Cuba to take a course on military training. Five months later, the "special actions" already had cadres, military equipment, and several clandestine locations. Their first target was the North Atlantic Treaty Organization (NATO) facilities near Rio de Mouro, but they are unsuccessful. That year, a wave of repression weakened the Party and the ARA, which is unable to contact the PCP leadership for months. In 1966 a new group of militants is sent to Cuba for military training, but when they return, influenced by the guerrilla line of foquismo, outside the party line, they break with the Party. In the meeting about the event, Álvaro Cunhal argued that future operatives of "special actions" should study in the Soviet Union instead of Cuba. In 1967, when Narciso returns from the Soviet Union, he is given the task of restructuring the "special actions" with Ângelo Veloso. In 1970, the "special actions" gathered approximately 42 operatives, being relatively stable, able to execute the actions already planned, and with a secure headquarters. In a context of radicalization of the Portuguese society, Raimundo Narciso starts directing the ARA with Jaime Serra and Francisco Miguel.

The "special actions" began to present themselves as Armed Revolutionary Action after the meeting held after the attack on the ship Cunene on October 26, 1970. On November 20, they detonated three bombs, each with a symbolic value, representing the fronts of political combat: the struggle against repression, colonial war and imperialism. The International and State Defense Police (PIDE) – predecessor of the General Directorate of Security (DGS) – only discovered that the ARA was an organization linked to the PCP in the sabotage of the Tancos air base, with the code name, Operation "Águia Real" (Royal Eagle), due to the complexity involved and the size of the feat, which resulted in the destruction of 28 aircraft, 13 of them irrecoverably. On June 3, 1971, there is a sabotage of the national and international telecommunication central during the NATO ministerial conference, which caused "great embarrassment" to the regime, and was reported worldwide. On October 2, the ARA carries out a mission to deflect explosive material in the assault on the quarry's gunroom. On October 27, two days before the inauguration of the Comiberlant Barracks, at 2 am, a bomb exploded, which caused giant destruction to the barracks, both inside and outside. In January 1972, the ARA carries out an action of destruction of sophisticated and new war material from France that was going to the colonial war on the ship Muxima, and in July there is an unsuccessful attempt to sabotage a ship. On August 9, on the day of Américo Tomás' inauguration, the ARA carries out one last action, which was to cut power throughout the country with sabotage actions.

After a year without action, and with conciliation between the opposition and the PCP, the ARA was suspended in May 1973. It had suffered heavy blows earlier, with the imprisonment of several important operatives. It remained clandestine until the Carnation Revolution, and was only dissolved with the fall of the dictatorial Estado Novo regime.

Political Theory

Use of violence 
In the meeting of the Central Committee of the Portuguese Communist Party that took place in December 1962, the question of the use of violence as an action of self-defense, and how to relate it to mass actions, was discussed for the first time. The position taken at this meeting would be remarked upon in later meetings:The possible organization of actions of a special type is a task to be carried out by special organizations which, although acting in conjunction with the actions and demonstrations of the masses and with the aim of stimulating them, must develop their action entirely independently of the action of the masses themselves. That is, the action of the organisms or groups for special actions can never be confused, even in the eyes of the repressive forces, with mass action and demonstrations.The fundamental for the PCP was peaceful mass actions, seeking the "mass uprising", with armed struggle actions out of the focus of the discussions, although they were addressed. The possibility of armed struggle was neither crossed out nor pursued, hence it sought to use these means only when it deemed appropriate. The motto followed by the Party in the April 1964 report Towards Victory allows the use of armed struggle, but the goal of the "Democratic and National Revolution" sought the action of the masses to overthrow the regime and its repressive apparatuses. The PCP pursued the overthrow of the dictatorship through the "national mass uprising," for which the conditions were not yet created, according to the Party, even though popular opposition against the regime was intensifying. For the Party, not being in a revolutionary situation would imply that the masses would not be ready to carry out this type of action. For the Party, its task was:not only to push forward the popular struggle which itself aggravates the crisis of the regime, but to prepare to be able to lead the country into the decisive and final struggle in the coming revolutionary situation. [...] Guided by Marxism-Leninism, defining our orientation supported by the facts, we work to hasten the creation of a revolutionary situation and to create the political and organizational conditions so as to rise to the demands of the situation.According to the PCP, if the broad mass struggles result in popular insurrection, during this process, due to the increase in confrontations between the repressive apparatus and the masses, the cadres trained here should move on to armed struggle. In this anti-fascist insurrection, for the PCP, the support of at least some part of the military would be fundamental, since these were the most important foundation of the regime. Therefore, the PCP always tried to create clandestine cells in the various divisions of the organization to work on agitation, advertisement, mobilization, and organization among the military who were unhappy with the regime. In the leadership there were divergent opinions on the issue of armed struggle, while some preferred the mass struggle, others argued that armed actions were the only way to overthrow a violent regime.

Ideological issues 
The PCP recognized the use of the aid of "special actions" always "as a deepening and intensification of the political and social movement". Álvaro Cunhal defined "petty-bourgeois radicalism" as the "main ideological deviation that could affect the Party:Today, petty-bourgeois radicalism, verbal revolutionarism, insists on only one thing: immediate direct action, immediate violent action, immediate armed struggle. There are people who talk like that and get sick when they hear about mass struggle and organization (...) This anarchist tendency is above all harmful because of the orientation it tries to give to the democratic struggle. It causes enormous harm in that it influences the democratic forces away from their essential, instantaneous, immediate tasks, without which they can never launch a victorious insurrection: the mass struggle and organization.The most radical sectors included the students and workers of the South Bank of Tagus River. The PCP did not rule out violence, but sought to use it within the paradigm of the "national uprising," as long as it was directed by the Party, and in a conjuncture of radicalization and intensification of the mass struggle, which could lead to a revolutionary environment to overthrow the dictatorship. The PCP also aimed to combat "right-wing opportunism", "adventurism" and "leftism". After Álvaro Cunhal was released from prison, he strongly criticized the "right-wing policy" of Júlio Fogaça, and the possibility of armed insurrection was discussed again. The Party was in a complex situation, with Cunhal's criticism of the "right-wing policy" followed until he left prison, the policy of peaceful coexistence followed by the Soviet Union, the most radical sectors of the workers' and students' movement, and the attempt to reach an understanding with other sectors of the opposition. This impasse was overcome after the fraudulent elections in which General Humberto Delgado participated, which increased radicalization in Portuguese society. In 1964, the PCP entered the process of formulating a structure of non-lethal armed struggle against the colonial and repressive apparatus of the Estado Novo regime, which eventually became the Armed Revolutionary Action, a unique organization in the European context, with no other communist Party having decided to use armed struggle. The ARA's actions would primarily target the colonial war, which symbolized imperialism, colonialism, repression and loss of life, also targeting the repressive state apparatus. The ARA would refuse to use lethal actions, always seeking to lessen the risk of loss of life, seeing the opposite as counterproductive. The ARA's struggle was intended to clearly delineate to the population that its target was the regime.

Background

Formation of "special actions" 
The PCP decided to begin the process of forming a new organization, focused on "special actions," stating that:The worsening crisis of the fascist regime, the development of the political struggle of the masses, their radicalization, the brutality of the repressive apparatus and the evolution of the colonial war, place a new task on the Party: the task of organizing actions of self-defense of the masses, actions aimed at hitting more directly the military apparatus of the colonial war, that create difficulties for the repressive apparatus, that hinder fascist propaganda and give new aspects to anti-fascist agitation and propaganda. The execution of such actions cannot be left to spontaneity. It must be faced on the practical ground.Rogério de Carvalho, a member of the Central Committee since 1963, was chosen to lay the foundations of the "special actions" organization, which began recruiting what would become the original core from 1964 onwards. Raimundo Narciso, a student at the Instituto Superior Técnico (IST) in Lisbon, who had been involved in several political activities, is contacted and goes underground. A militia officer is also contacted, who refuses, and Almeida, who was a collaborator from 1965 to 1966, but he also refuses to go underground because he is finishing his course, being willing to be a party militant and do the tasks indicated. Therefore, the "special actions" began to consist only of two employees and the support of Almeida.

In early 1965, Rogério de Carvalho and Raimundo Narciso pass through the Soviet Union before going to Cuba for military training. Both had been militia officers in the Portuguese Army at different times. In the Soviet Union they had a meeting with Álvaro Cunhal and Francisco Miguel Duarte, receiving orientation directly from Álvaro Cunhal, who defined what the objective of the organization was. According to Raimundo Narciso, "the intention of the PCP was to create a parallel structure, although politically tutored and supported, which meant that the Party disengaged itself from direct and assumed responsibility for the actions to be unleashed". They spent two months receiving a course in handling weapons, explosives, and guerrilla techniques in Cuba, in a mansion in El Vedado, Havana.

When they arrived in Portugal, looking for a support network, they made contact with António Pedro Ferreira (pseudonym "Morais"), a student at the Instituto Superior Técnico, Leonel (pseudonym), an engineer and fighter in the colonial war, and the worker Mário Reis.

Suppliers 
Paratrooper Lieutenant Cassiano Bessa, a PCP-linked officer, the main supplier of any materials he managed to divert from the barracks, is denounced, but manages to flee the country before being arrested. This was an "important loss" for the "special actions". Most of the equipment used by the "special actions" and the later Armed Revolutionary Action, such as weaponry and explosive material, originated in the Portuguese Army, and was either diverted by militants, sympathizers, or military personnel who were against the war. In 1967, work within the Armed Forces intensified in Portugal and the colonies. The bulletin IRFA – Revolutionary Information for the Armed Forces began to be published. This PCP organization in the Armed Forces lasted until the revolution of April 25, 1974, and according to Carlos Brito, "this party structure proved to be of great importance, because it was through it that the PCP was able to follow very closely the movement of the captains, later MFA (Armed Forces Movement), from the beginning and in its evolution".

Leonel (pseudonym), when he fought in Mozambique, embezzled material, keeping it in a bag that he took with him to Portugal. He took this risk alone, since he had not received any indication from the Party, and only took the risk because he believed it would be useful in the fight against the regime. When this information reached the PCP, he was put in contact with the "special actions" organization. According to Raimundo Narciso, "[the] war in Africa was a true school of training in the armed struggle against fascism and the colonial war. Technical training, but mainly political and psychological. The Colonial War made many young people mature for the armed struggle against Marcelism". Raimundo Narciso received the explosive material, and in 1966 Leonel went for political training and military training in the Soviet Union, the year in which he cut off contacts with Raimundo. Despite this, Raimundo has one last contact with Leonel – when the ARA sabotages the telecommunications of a North Atlantic Treaty Organization meeting in Lisbon, Leonel, surprisingly, is sent by the incumbent company to repair the damage (caused by the explosives themselves).

Mayer (pseudonym), the caretaker of a family with ties to the Estado Novo, was the organization's supplier of chemicals that were needed in the manufacture of explosives. This included controlled-sale chemicals, such as concentrated sulfuric acid.

Attack attempt 
After five months, through the recruitment of Rogério de Carvalho and Raimundo Narciso, as well as the Portuguese Communist Party, the "special actions" already had cadres prepared to begin their actions, as well as facilities to store the equipment, namely a villa with an gunroom function in Mafra, a rented garage, and three storage rooms in Lisbon. It also had weapons and high-powered explosives, from military personnel with ties to the Portuguese Communist Party, and a number of possible targets.

The first target was the North Atlantic Treaty Organization facilities, near Rio de Mouro, with the objective of causing an inoculable impact and forcing the regime to admit that there was opposition, both to it and to the colonial war. Antunes (pseudonym), a metallurgical worker from a war material factory, was in charge of placing it near NATO's facilities. Narciso waited a few hundred meters away in a getaway car, however, Antunes did not return and disappeared, so there was no knowledge of him and the bomb, which led to the failure of this first action.

Arrests of 1965 
In October 1965, there was a wave of arrests by the International and State Defense Police (PIDE) that caused alarm among the operatives, with the arrest of several Portuguese Communist Party militants, some militia officers, and two employees of the Armed Revolutionary Action's leading command, Rogério de Carvalho and Álvaro Veiga de Oliveira. In this wave of repression, the garage, the two storage rooms, and some weapons were confiscated. Despite this, the villa in Mafra and the material stored there remained in the possession of the ARA, because only Rogério knew about it, and Narciso was sure that he would not talk to the police.

After the wave of repression, several measures were taken to safeguard the organization and its operatives – whose only connection to the PCP was made through Rogério, now in prison. According to Raimundo Narciso, the attempts to contact the Party in Lisbon were made "with the utmost care not to approach anyone who was being watched by the PIDE and, on the other hand, had enough confidence in us not to take my strange diligence for some trap of the political police". However, reconnecting with the directorate appeared to be impossible, leading to the suspension of the "special actions" until the connection with the directorate could be made, therefore remaining isolated and with few operatives. The new recruits made it possible to maintain activity and cover expenses. In August 1966, the connection with the PCP leadership, which believed that Narciso had abandoned clandestinity and the fight, was re-established through Ângelo Veloso, who became the intermediary between the PCP and the "special actions".

Due to the weakening of the Party apparatus after the wave of repression, particularly in Lisbon, Rogério is informed by Ângelo Veloso that the Party had decided to send him to the Soviet Union to take a political training course, and that the "special actions" would have to be suspended in the meantime, due to the leadership's ignorance of how much knowledge the International and State Defense Police (PIDE) had about them. A group of militants was also sent to Cuba to take a military course, with the aim of being later integrated into the "special actions".

Contact with the foquismo 
The group of four militants who had been sent to Cuba broke with the PCP and decided to create the guerrilla group FAL (Armed Liberation Forces), which lasted until 1969, when one of the commanders was arrested. Earlier, after finishing their course, they met in Prague with Álvaro Cunhal and Manuel Rodrigues da Silva, both members of the Secretariat, and Carlos Brito. According to Carlos Brito, "it was a difficult meeting. The comrades came on another wave. Conquered by the Cuban line, they wanted nothing 'special actions' complementary to the mass political struggle and mainly directed against the colonial war apparatus". In this meeting, Álvaro Cunhal agrees to discuss with the group the strategy of the "guerrilla focus" (foquismo), where he tried to "show them that it was impossible to adapt this theory to the Portuguese reality and that the line defined by the Party was the most viable". After the meeting, although they affirmed their willingness to follow the Party, Cunhal believed it to be a "very serious risk to open such a delicate work front with comrades who have such deeply held convictions contrary to the Party's line", and he believed that the group would continue to try to apply the foquismo in Portugal. In the meeting of the Secretariat on the group, Cunhal defends that the future operatives of Armed Revolutionary Action should do their military training in the Soviet Union. Despite the leadership's efforts to reach an agreement, the group only agrees to leave the PCP discreetly.

Restructuring of "special actions" 
When Narciso returns from Moscow in June 1967, he finds a disorganized, weak, and disarticulated organization. He and Ângelo Veloso were given the task of restructuring the "special actions". The two leaders rented two storage rooms in Lisbon, a garage in Amadora, and a villa near Sintra to store war material, among others. In 1968 they bought a farmhouse northeast of Torres Vedras to serve as a central gunroom, and it would remain that way until the Carnation Revolution on April 25, 1974. To safeguard the place from the police, a couple of clandestine employees of the PCP were appointed, who, labeling themselves as housekeepers of a landlord who only went there a few times, managed to lower any suspicions. A group of militants, including three from the PCP, was sent to Moscow to receive military training and to be later integrated into "special actions. Part of this group was Francisco Miguel Duarte, another individual under the pseudonym Almendra, and a third whose only known information is that, according to Almendra, he was a worker. At the time, Almendra was a student member of the Central Committee of the PCP exiled in Paris. In this course, they learned ship sabotage actions, weapons handling, making and using bombs, grenades and Molotov cocktails, and military strategy, among others. According to Almendra, great preparation and physical and psychological capacity were required.

At the same time, reorganization continued in Portugal, and the PCP's line was for its militants to fulfill compulsory military service, therefore increasing political work within the Armed Forces, both in the barracks and in the colonies. With the growing supply of material, Narciso and Ângelo Veloso's most pressing complaint was the lack of operatives capable of armed action. When Francisco Miguel returned, he became the link between the "special actions" and the PCP Central Committee, replacing Ângelo Veloso.

Constitution of the ARA 
In 1968, those who would later join the Armed Revolutionary Action (ARA) arrived in Portugal, Francisco Miguel and Almendra, whose pseudonym and the fact that he arrived married to a French woman are the only known information about him. From 1968 to 1970, the "special actions" gathered approximately 42 operatives, being relatively stable, able to execute the actions already planned and with their gunroom secure. During this period, their activity was logistics and recognition. In July 1970, PCP Central Committee member Jaime Serra was appointed to lead the ARA, and Joaquim Gomes became the link between the Party and the ARA. It was the Central Command's responsibility to choose targets, prepare and execute missions, and supervise the organization's operatives. Therefore, since the ARA was an autonomous structure of the PCP, it answered directly to the executive committee, from which it received its funding, material, and operatives. It was a semi-autonomous organization that had difficulty recruiting operatives since the Party kept the organization as "ultra-clandestine" and only a few leaders knew of its existence. Raimundo says about the recruitment of cadres and operatives:They couldn't put in recent cadres or people who didn't give guarantees. These cadres generally didn't come, and the Party tended to send cadres they didn't want in other organizations. Generally, they didn't send the good cadres that were needed in other organizations. They sent people who had a propensity for special actions and who were sent here so that they could be framed and not cause problems in other organizations. The people who came to the ARA had to be in agreement with the armed actions.There was also recruitment of people close to the leaders through trust. Within the organization, there was compartmentalization of the cells, and each cell had no knowledge of the other, not even among the leaders. According to Ana Ferreira, in her PhD thesis in Contemporary History, "as such, we can say that the ARA was a highly disciplined organization, and its members were perfectly aware of the risks they ran by being part of the organization and participating in armed actions". The ARA followed the Party's instructions; however, the leadership also made independent decisions regarding armed actions, intense political repression, and disagreements within the PCP over the use of armed struggle. When armed struggle was once again discussed in May 1970 by the Central Committee of the PCP, the beginning of armed actions was determined, and Jaime Serra, Raimundo Narciso, and Francisco Miguel were nominated as leaders. In the national conjuncture, the radicalization of society unfolded, mostly among youth and students, with the constitution of several groups that proclaimed the armed struggle, such as the Liga de Unidade e Ação Revolucionária, the Portuguese National Liberation Front, the Portuguese Revolutionary Joint, and the Brigadas Revolucionárias. The armed struggle does not begin until 1970 due to the rigorous preparations of its operatives, intense political repression, and disagreements over the use of violence.

Operations

Attack on Cunene 
The first armed action began to be planned and recognized in August 1970, and after a month, the target was defined and the formulation of the plan was finished, but due to clandestinity Gabriel Pedro could not reach Portugal in time. In October, the liner Vera Cruz and the "most modern cargo ship of the African lines", the Cunene, arrived in Portugal. Gabriel Pedro would sail with Carlos Coutinho to the liner Vera Cruz, the latter being in charge of installing the explosive charges on the ship. After formulating the initial plan, studying mainly the Algés dock and its surroundings, the routes and times of the meetings (strictly obeying the compartmentalization, not crossing each other). Gabriel Pedro, after studying the plan further, delivered an amendment, leading to a total reformulation of the procedures. He had the most central role of the entire operation – to take possession of a rowboat and row Carlos Coutinho to the Vera Cruz liner. Gabriel Pedro was 72 years old, a known "old communist militant," and spent several years imprisoned in the Tarrafal concentration camp. Participating in the operation were Raimundo Narciso, Francisco Miguel, Carlos Coutinho, Gabriel Pedro, António João Eusébio, Manuel Policarpo Guerreiro, and Victor d' Almeida d'Eça. Shortly before the operation began, the explosive charges that Raimundo Narciso and Francisco Miguel had assembled in the ARA laboratory in Arruda dos Vinhos were moved to a trusted location in Alcântara, with the clocks synchronized for 5 am.

Start of operation 
On October 26, 1970, at 9:45 pm, the operation began. After several meetings between the operatives, Carlos Coutinho and Gabriel Pedro rowed out of the Poço do Bispo dock, in Marvila. Disguised as fishermen, there was a low risk of being detected. They managed to reach the Vera Cruz liner without any damage, although they almost collided with a cargo ship, which Gabriel Pedro managed to avoid. However, when they reached the liner, they encountered an unexpected approach by the maritime police patrol, which made it impossible for Gabriel Pedro to advance without being detected. Since the clocks for the bombs were synchronized for 5 am, they had to decide quickly, and chose to plant them in Cunene. With difficulties in placing the bombs on site, as they had to be placed in a clean place under water, Carlos Coutinho had to use a steel brush for the magnets to work. He was at risk of slipping and falling into the river, but after persisting, the placing of the bombs under water is successful. After the mission, Gabriel Pedro emigrated to Paris, where he died two years later, in February 1972.

Result 
The next day, news about an explosion on the Cunene was published in the newspapers. The newspaper O Século included a photograph of the ship with a rupture. The newspaper Diário de Notícias presented an interview with several individuals, with the commander stating that "the rupture would have been motivated by a piping of diesel or gases in the hold".

On the same day, there is a meeting of the ARA Central Command. Jaime Serra presented the statement made at this one to Reuters, France Press and United Press. There being the need to create a name to claim the action, the name Armed Revolutionary Action was chosen, at Raimundo Narciso's suggestion.

In the same announcement, the line defended by the Portuguese Communist Party was emphasized again, and that this action was part of the mass struggle.

The "Triple Action"

Preparation 
In the meetings after the Cunene action, new targets were formulated, one of them being the PIDE/DGS headquarters. However, this idea was discarded, since the place was very difficult to access and it would be impossible to place a bomb that would not cause casualties, so the PIDE Technical School, near Benfica Road, was proposed as a target. This action, capable of hitting the regime and its repressive apparatus, was then formulated with several other targets. To hit imperialism, symbolized by the United States of America as American imperialism, the Cultural Center of the United States, on Duque de Loulé Avenue, was chosen as a target. Finally, a military target was chosen, choosing a ship that was about to leave Portugal with war equipment – the Niassa. At the meeting the groups were formed and how and with what to act.

The three actions had a symbolic value, each representing the fronts of political combat: the struggle against repression, the colonial war and imperialism.

PIDE's Technical School 
Superficially, the action with the bomb at the PIDE/DGS Technical School would be the easiest to accomplish. The explosive device would be placed in the street, near the Technical School, with little movement at night, and it was unpredictable that a passerby would pass by at exactly the moment of the explosion, or that he would tamper with the box that housed the device. To reduce the risk, the bomb was planted on the site only at 3:40 in the morning, twenty minutes before the explosion. However, it turned fateful for a 15-year-old who had returned from work. It is not possible to know if he tried to move and open the box that housed the bomb or if he passed by there when it exploded. It was the only ARA action that had a fateful outcome.

The press reported the fatality along with the explosions, and PIDE/DGS formulated this to be an ARA operative. The ARA considered the fatality a victim of repression and fascism, and assessed as a mistake the placement of the explosive device outside the building, never executing actions with targets near the public road again.

Foundry Wharf 
The ship Niassa was chosen as a good target, since it was stationed at the Foundry Wharf in Lisbon and was ready to carry ordnance for the colonial war. The ARA Central Committee learned about the Niassa due to António Pedro Ferreira, a PCP militant who worked at the Army's Transport Service Directorate. The operation would involve sending a parcel booby-trapped to a soldier, which would be kept in the hold of the ship. A large explosive device accompanied by an incendiary charge and two paired watches were placed, in case one failed, to detonate 18 hours after shipment. The box was strengthened by steel straps as was customary when objects were sent to soldiers, to lessen the chances of someone opening it.

The bomb did not explode in Niassa, but at the Wharf warehouse, due to unexpected bureaucracy that delayed the shipment for a day. The bomb detonated at six in the morning, waking up the inhabitants of the area.

United States Cultural Center 
The plan for the action at the American Cultural Center was to place the explosive device inside the building, with the clock synchronized for dawn. The bomb would enter the building inside a thick spine book to go unnoticed. The task of executing this mission was Romeo (pseudonym), a militia furir who was doing his mandatory military service in the Commandos.

The mission begins weeks before, with Romeo's visit to the Cultural Center. There, after examining and analyzing what he needed, he bought a book in English at a bookstore very similar to the ones he had observed. After being opened and filled with a pound of explosive plastic by ARA operatives, the book was placed in a shirt box to imitate a gift. On the day of the operation, at 6:30 pm, Romeo enters the Cultural Center with the shirt box and asks if he could go look at the books. After waiting for the visitors to leave, he went to the shelf he had examined weeks before, and replaced one of the books with the book bomb, placing the center's book in the shirt box and leaving at seven o'clock in the afternoon. The device exploded at 4:30 in the morning. The two PSP guards guarding the place, as well as two other individuals, were non-seriously injured by the window panes.

The PIDE/DGS never discovered how the operation happened, concluding that the operatives had entered through the back door.

Result of the three actions 
On November 20, 1970, the three bombs were detonated. The press emphasized what had happened, with the interview with the head of the PIDE/DGS. The PIDE/DGS did not yet know that the ARA was linked to the PCP, and thought it was a Maoist group.

Operation "Águia Real" (Royal Eagle)

Preparation 
In the early morning of March 8, 1971, one of ARA's greatest actions took place – the sabotage at the Tancos air base – which resulted in the destruction of dozens of military airplanes and helicopters. In August 1970, Raimundo Narciso got in touch with Ângelo de Sousa, a young Air Force militia corporal, through Jaime Serra. Ângelo de Sousa was doing his mandatory military service by enrolling in a pilot course at Air Base No. 3 in Tancos. After this contact, they began to think about a possible action at the base. Fifteen days later, Ângelo met with Raimundo to propose a sabotage action – the explosion of several military planes, with an explosive device introduced at dawn by an ARA commando.

Ângelo de Sousa asked for the keys from a corporal who lent them for gasoline refueling, even to sergeants and officers, and lent them to Jaime Serra to produce a copy. However, the scheme was discovered and an inquiry was opened, delaying the operations procedure – the inquiry was eventually shelved, and the illicit supply continued, which allowed the plan to continue. The entrance to the hangar would be made by ARA operatives disguised as military personnel, who would be introduced by Ângelo de Sousa to the guard as military personnel from Ota Air Base. After entering the complex, they would place bombs with incendiary charges and electrical circuits in each aircraft, detonating them at the same time. The commanders of the action who would be transported via a hired car to the base were Ângelo de Sousa, Carlos Coutinho, and António João Eusébio, with Raimundo Narciso in charge of coordination. After the operation, Ângelo de Sousa would stay in a safe apartment until the Party could get him abroad. A very complex full technical simulation was made, according to Raimundo Narciso, at the farm in Arruda dos Vinhos.

Action 
In the early morning hours of March 7, 1971, the commandos who would participate in the action gathered at the clandestine ARA apartment on Estados Unidos da América Avenue and checked that everything was right with the electrical system. When they arrived at Tancos with the vehicles, they entered easily, "without searches or formalities, as planned". After using the key to enter the hangar, and confirming the data they had previously acquired, they set up the electrical and explosive system. If there was any mistakes with the watches, now in the last procedure – connecting the charges to the batteries – they would trigger an explosion and it would be fatal. After overcoming the most dangerous part of the operation, Carlos Coutinho leaves, leaving a trap by the door, which, should anyone try to open it, would trigger the whole explosive apparatus. The three manage to leave the base without any suspicion.

Result 
At 3:45 am the explosion is triggered. The explosion resulted in a large fire, irrecoverably destroying five helicopters, eight aircraft, as well as damaging with varying degrees of severity fifteen more aircraft, heavily damaging the hangar. The Secretary of State for Aeronautics receives a secret report describing the system that caused the explosions and its damage. The ARA delivers a press release claiming the event, emphasizing its complexity and success, as well as the courage of its operatives, also stressing that "the increasingly predominant anti-colonialist feeling among the Portuguese soldiers, sons of the people in uniform, contributed decisively to its success" ending with the exhortation "down with the colonial war! Long live the armed popular insurrection!".

Photographs of Ângelo de Sousa are widely published in the press, accompanied by a note that included several accusations. Only after this action did PIDE/DGS begin to link the ARA to the PCP, since, such was its size and complexity, it could only have behind it a well-structured organization with an efficient and capable logistical and technical apparatus. From the police point of view, "only the PCP would have the structures, operations and deployment to successfully conduct an operation as complex as this one".

The Central Committee of the PCP hailed the formation of the ARA as "an important political event in national political life," highlighting the "political justness" of its struggle against the colonial war, fascism, and imperialism, evaluating that they gave rise to "a wave of enthusiasm and gave greater confidence to the popular struggle on the path of armed insurrection".

Álvaro Cunhal also stressed that the revolutionary movement in Portugal had little experience in this type of struggle, and that each action taken should be studied to improve future ones.

Action against NATO meeting 
On June 3, 1971, several ministers from countries belonging to North Atlantic Treaty Organization gathered in Lisbon as well as hundreds of international journalists seeking to report on the events of the meeting, which was warmly announced by Marcello Caetano, many years after the last one. ARA's action at this meeting was intended to draw the international media's attention to the colonial war and the opposition struggle in Portugal. Jaime Serra's brother, Alberto Serra, was a technician in the telephone and telecommunications central office in Lisbon. He knew the whole communications system, wires and underground cables, which were the crucial point in the communications between Portugal and abroad. Coordinated by Raimundo Narciso, the command was made up of Carlos Coutinho, António Eusébio, and Alberto Serra.

That day, three operatives disguised as company workers entered the Central Telecommunications Office with two explosive charges, with the clocks set to go off at 3:30 am. The big explosion shook and isolated Lisbon from the outside world, with a total cut-off of communications for six hours. The sabotage of the national and international telecommunications center in Lisbon during the NATO ministerial conference caused "great embarrassment" to the regime, and was reported worldwide, as in the French newspaper Le Figaro, the English The Guardian, and on BBC and West German radio. Furthermore, on the same day, the ARA also intended to cut the electricity in Lisbon, making it impossible to broadcast Marcello Caetano's speech. Three different cells were formed: one with Raimundo Narciso and Ramiro Morgado, who would act in Sacavém; another with Carlos Coutinho and António Eusébio, who would act together with the previous cell; and the last one with Francisco Miguel, Manuel dos Santos Guerreiro and Manuel Policarpo Guerreiro, who would act in Belas. The operation did not develop in the way they had hoped, as the explosive charges used were insufficient. Even so, there was the destruction of the function of some poles, which was enough to knock out the electricity in certain areas of Lisbon, mainly the Palace of Ajuda, where the NATO meeting was taking place.

In the statement released, ARA states that these operations were a protest against the NATO Ministerial Council meeting, which, "besides being a warmongering and imperialist manifestation", also had the "moral and political support to the fascist and colonialist government", being seen as a provocation to the Portuguese people, "deprived for long years of the most elementary democratic freedoms" supposedly defended by NATO. It is also stated that the operations led to "the greatest confusion and disorientation in the means assigned to the NATO meeting, as well as among the fascist authorities," emphasizing that "the services of the meeting were seriously affected".

Assault on the quarry's armory 
On October 2, 1971, a quarry in Loures is robbed, with the detour of explosive material as the target. It was the only action of its kind made by the ARA, due to the small amount of explosives it had in its possession, because of the increased security in the barracks (from which material was diverted) due to the increase in attacks against the regime that year. After it became known to the Central Command that there was an abundant amount of explosive material in an armory located in a quarry in Loures, reconnaissance missions began with Francisco Miguel, Raimundo Narciso, along with his wife and daughter, António Pedro Ferreira and Ramiro Morgado.

That night, the commando left Lisbon in the direction of the armory. Manuel dos Santos Guerreiro and Raimundo Narciso were in a car. Fifteen minutes ahead of them were Manuel Policarpo Guerreiro and Amado Ventura da Silva, on the latter's motorcycle. Finally, Jorge Trigo de Sousa went alone in his car, staying far enough away from the quarry so that he could not be seen or see the other operatives. His job was to carry out armed surveillance at one end of the quarry, controlling the guard's house and the access road to the operations area, so as to prevent any intervention by the guard or anyone else.  After breaking through the barbed wire and knocking down the door of the armory, it was possible to steal 498 kg of dynamite and vast detonators and incendiary cord, leaving the site at 4 am.

This action remained unknown to the police until 1973.

Ataque ao Comiberlant 
The inauguration of the new NATO Headquarters facilities in Oeiras was scheduled for October 29, 1971. The NATO Command for the Ibero-Atlantic region (Comiberlant) was intended to be a communications system for all other headquarters. These installations were seen by the ARA as an act of provocation and proof of the collaboration of NATO countries with the Portuguese dictatorship and the colonial war, and therefore an attack on this barracks would have a very strong symbolism. To transport the explosives inside, it was necessary to pass by the guard's house, and Raimundo Narciso and Victor Eça reconnoitered the place. Manuel dos Santos Guerreiro and Manuel Policarpo Guerreiro were chosen to carry out the operation, which was to take place during the early hours of the morning, when there was a chance that the guards had fallen asleep. One of the ARA commanders lived near the target and knew several of its employees, having much knowledge about the inside of the building, which contributed to the success of the operation, according to Jaime Serra. The choice of the operatives was subject of intense debate between Raimundo Narciso and Francisco Miguel, since Carlos Coutinho, Ângelo de Sousa, Eusébio and Jaime Serra, some of his most experienced operatives, were in Moscow taking technical-military training courses.

During the night, Raimundo Narciso is taken by Jorge Trigo de Sousa to the storeroom in Campo de Ourique. After picking up the bomb, hidden in a wooden box and decorated as if it were a birthday present, they left for Oeiras, where Manuel Guerreiro was. Manuel Policarpo Guerreiro received the bomb and it was his job to place it in the building. Raimundo Narciso, Manuel Policarpo Guerreiro, and Manuel Guerreiro entered by opening the gate, and headed first to the guard's house, where Narciso was hiding, and then to the main building, where they left the bomb. At 2 am, the bomb exploded, causing a giant destruction in the Comiberlant Barracks, with the collapse of part of the facade and wall, windows, doors, almost all the furniture, and electronic devices.

According to Raimundo Narciso, censorship blocked any news about what happened in the newspapers. Since the action had happened only two days before the commemoration, there was an effort to repair the building's façade to hide the damage from the explosion, but it was an impossible feat, so the site of the inauguration ceremony was moved to the street, on an improvised stage, which turned out to be a fiasco. While Portuguese newspapers censored any news about the action, international newspapers got wind of what had happened. The PIDE began an investigation, questioning the workers, and both Portuguese Navy and US military personnel. This investigation continued for months, and this action "constituted a new and greater humiliation for the government of Marcello Caetano, which had planned a solemn public act with the presence of NATO's main generals, its secretary-general Josef Luns, and the Supreme Allied European Commander of the Atlantic, Admiral Charles Duncan, in order to demonstrate that the Portuguese government was not isolated", and that it was defended by the "international community". In the announcement released, the ARA declared that there were no casualties, and that, contrary to what the government was claiming, there had been no captures.

Attack on Muxima 
On January 12, 1972, the ARA carries out an action to destroy new and sophisticated war material from France, which was on its way to the colonial war on the ship Muxima. They obtained information about the logistics of the ship from a former Milican officer, commander of the merchant navy. António Pedro Ferreira and Raimundo Narciso formulated a plan, the objective of which was to place a suitcase with explosives in the hold, delivered by an official customs agent. António Pedro Ferreira, with his experience over the Transport Service Directorate, would be able to control the direction of the luggage without being directly involved. At the Central Committee meeting (Raimundo Narciso and Francisco Miguel), three operatives were chosen: Manuel Guerreiro, Manuel Policarpo Guerreiro and Ramiro Morgado.

Manuel dos Santos Guerreiro had the responsibility to go and buy a one-way ticket to Luanda to check at customs that the owner of the luggage was traveling to one of the colonies. A week later, Manuel Guerreiro went to the official forwarding agent's office due to send the suitcase to Luanda. The suitcase, taken to the pier in a van rented by Manuel Guerreiro, had inside dishes, old books, and, inside a wooden box, the explosives. The bomb detonates in the early morning hours of January 12, 1972, causing massive destruction to the wharf and warehouses.

The PIDE quickly begins investigations, and interrogated any people who may have had a connection to the suitcase. Manuel Guerreiro, in booking the flight and dispatching the suitcase provided a false name. Several ''António Pires'' were arrested and interrogated because of their name. In the ARA announcement, the destruction of abundant ordnance ready for the colonial war was declared, and that revolutionary activity would continue, in solidarity with the struggle of the peoples of the colonies.

Failed action in Figueira da Foz 
ARA learned about the construction in Figueira da Foz of patrol vessels reserved for the Guinea war, as well as their operation, logistics and other relevant information from a member of the local organization of the Portuguese Communist Party. Raimundo Narciso did reconnaissance of the site, gaining knowledge about the ships, access and security, going on vacation to Figueira da Foz beach with his wife. The objective, analogous to Cunene, was to place an explosive in the hull of a ship, however, this time one would have to reach the ship by swimming.

On July 25, 1972, Raimundo Narciso waits with Carlos Coutinho for the operative who was going to execute the action. However, the operative did not show up either at that location or at the previously marked resource locations. When they return to Lisbon, they find him, and although he has already met Raimundo at the same place, he apologizes saying that he confused the place and time, and that he is ready to go ahead with the operation. When he returns, he says that the execution was successful and that the bomb was planted and programmed. Raimundo Narciso says that he was "left with a bad impression about the action, that he sensed something had gone wrong, and that he did not believe the excuses the operative had given for missing the meetings".

There was no explosion, and the PIDE, in a statement, claims that a bomb was found and defused in the shipyards. ARA has never been able to clarify how the action took place.

Operation "Short-Circuit" 
On August 9, 1972, the inauguration as President of the Republic was once again to be led by Américo Tomás. With the great popular support for Humberto Delgado in the 1958 Portuguese presidential elections, the regime started using an electoral college to choose who would occupy that position. The ARA's plan for such an event consisted of cutting off power throughout the country with sabotage actions concurrently carried out in Belas and Vialonga in Lisbon, Ermesinde in Oporto, and Coimbra. Besides being a great action, which needed more operatives, the best in ARA, including the Central Command, were chosen. Jaime Serra had returned from the Soviet Union, and this was the first ARA action since his return. In contrast to the other two Central Command members, Jaime Serra and Francisco Miguel, Raimundo Narciso had not yet been arrested, so he was not known as a Portuguese Communist Party leader. As such, Raimundo Narciso was in charge of execution and coordination on the ground, unlike the other two, who participated only in the decision-making and planning process and in reconnaissance missions. Nevertheless, given the size of the action, it would have the participation of the entire Central Command. ARA targeted twenty steel towers of the national power grid's high voltage lines in Lisbon, Coimbra, and Porto. The ARA, when it was only "special actions", had already done reconnaissance of a large part of these towers, which was once again repeated. Francisco Miguel and Raimundo Narciso would execute in Lisbon, being Francisco Miguel and his group responsible for the two towers in Belas, and Raimundo Narciso and his group responsible for the 6 towers in Vialonga. Jaime Serra would be responsible for the execution in Porto, and Ângelo de Sousa in Coimbra, with four towers.

On the day of the action, Raimundo Narciso was responsible for verifying that the action was being carried out, having entrusted Carlos Coutinho with his place. On the night of the action, he traveled from Lisbon to Coimbra, and finally to Porto. With the support of the Portuguese Communist Party, both in transportation and in housing – the operatives stayed in the homes of militants for several days – a house was rented to assemble the explosives and another clandestine house to function as a laboratory, storage and sleeping place. Eighty loads of explosive material, many detonators, watches, and hundreds of meters of electrical wire were transported and used. After the detailed choice of the towers, both to facilitate their overthrow and to not cause any incident, the bombs were successfully exploded, resulting in a lack of electricity for several hours in various locations around the country.

According to Jaime Serra, the action "had great political repercussion and overshadowed the inauguration of the President of the Republic," and was broadcast with emphasis, being impossible to ignore. This was the last action of the ARA.

End of ARA 

The ARA was suspended in May 1973. The actions had not been carried out since August 1972, and the decision to suspend the ARA by the ARA Central Command and the Secretariat of the Central Committee of the PCP was due to several factors. The Party emphasized mass actions, workers' struggle, and the unity of the opposition against the regime, with the context of a conciliation with the opposition, especially with the Portuguese Socialist Action (ASP) and progressive Catholics, which discouraged armed actions. Contacts between the PCP and the ASP, later the Socialist Party (PS), became common since their meeting in the spring of 1972, between the delegation of Álvaro Cunhal and Carlos Brito and the delegation of Mário Soares and Ramos da Costa. In October 1973, the PCP signed with the then-founding PS a common announcement defending "the constitution of a provisional democratic government that would promote free elections, the end of the colonial war and the independence of the colonies, the conquest of democratic liberties and the struggle against capitalist monopoly". The ARA states that "verifying that a broad political movement is developing in the country, whose successes are important for the weakening of the fascist and colonialist dictatorship, it determined a temporary pause of certain actions, with a view to facilitating that other possibilities of the anti-fascist popular struggle be deepened to the maximum". Simultaneously, there was the arrest in 1970 of six important ARA operatives, which weakened the organization.

Although the ARA was a separate organization from the PCP, they had several connections. For example, M, a worker at the Port of Lisbon who contacted Jaime Serra, had important information that could lead to an ARA sabotage action. However, when arrested, he denounced everything he knew to the police. The event that most hurt the organization was the betrayal of PCP employee Augusto Lindolfo, who denounced militants and sympathizers of the Party, and, through these, the PIDE set up a network of contacts that led to the capture in early 1973 of Manuel Policarpo Guerreiro; Jesuína Maria Coelho Rodrigues Guerreiro; Carlos Alberto da Silva Coutinho; Amado de Jesus Ventura da Silva; Manuel dos Santos Guerreiro; Mário Wrem Abrantes da Silva; José Augusto de Jesus Brandão and Ramiro Rodrigues Morgado. In addition to this loss, the persecution by the political police complicated the carrying out of actions. In 1973, Augusto Lindolfo was the target of an assassination attempt, which PIDE attributed to the ARA, although no one claimed responsibility for the attack.

The ARA Central Command remained underground until the revolution of April 25, 1974, and was only dissolved with the fall of the dictatorial Estado Novo regime, then led by Marcello Caetano.

Operational

Central command

Main operational

After the revolution 
After the Carnation Revolution on April 25, 1974, the ARA was dissolved, and its operatives returned to normal political life. According to one operative, "after April 25, the ARA was no longer necessary, it was no longer legitimate. Even if their operations were fair, they had no legitimacy in the democracy that was developing".

On the use of lethality, for ARA operatives "our actions would not create casualties and that would prevent the regime from calling us terrorists. They could never say that. And the population could also make the distinction, since they were not attacked, and they were not confused either." About the FP-25 attacks in the 1980s, according to a reflection by an ARA operative, "[...] they killed a man in Sacavém. That man was a scoundrel, who deserved to die five hundred times, but that operation should never have happened because it challenged... for the collective conscience that called into question the nature of a left that wanted to be necessary, that wanted to be just, and to be ethical." So while the targets are legitimate, the political violence of FP-25 is seen as counterproductive to the overall struggle.

Coutinho, when arrested in 1973, says that "I was under sleep torture for about 300 hours, divided into two periods: one of nine consecutive days, and another of four," he even tried to find ways to commit suicide. Referring to the PIDE/DGS response about the Tancos sabotage, he said that "to excuse their lack of effectiveness, the PIDE/DGS was attributing to us a kind of 'superhuman ability', superior to that of a James Bond... [...] these stories spread, with people talking and commenting. In the Montecarlo coffee shop, which I frequented, the attack on Tancos and the superman who entered there were the topic of conversation. I made a huge effort not to laugh and ended up agreeing, so as not to leave any suspicion".

See also 

 Red Brigades
 Red Army Faction
 Antifaschistische Aktion
 National Liberation Action
 Brigadas Revolucionárias
 FP-25
 Armed Forces Movement
 Grândola, Vila Morena

References

Bibliography

Academic Sources

Books

Articles

External links 

 Armed Revolutionary Action. ARA Operations and Communications, by Raimundo Narciso

Portuguese Communist Party
Political parties in Portugal
Political history of Portugal
Anti-imperialism
Anti-fascism